Zedner is a Jewish-German surname. The name originates from the town of Zehden, in Brandenburg province in Germany. Notable people with the surname include:

 Joseph Zedner (1804–1871), German bibliographer and librarian
 Lucia Zedner, British legal scholar

See also
 Zedner v. United States, 547 U.S. 489 (2006), a United States Supreme Court case

References

German-language surnames
Jewish surnames
Yiddish-language surnames